Khong Azhdar-e Ali Ayavel (also Romanized as Khong Azhdar-e ʿAlī Āyāvel) is a village in Howmeh-ye Gharbi Rural District, in the Central District of Izeh County, Khuzestan Province, Iran. At the 2006 census, its population was 31, in 6 families.

References 

Populated places in Izeh County